Bizkit & Butta is a multi-Grammy nominated, platinum selling record production duo consisting of Keith "Butta" Justice and Allen "BizKit" Arthur.  Currently located in Los Angeles, the two were previously part of the Philadelphia-based production team known as "Phatboiz", along with colleague Clayton "Gravy" Riley.

Formation

Justice and Arthur first met as teenagers at the Philadelphia High School for Creative and Performing Arts. Arthur, a saxophonist, spent much of the early 2000s performing with soul, R&B, and Hip Hop artists such as Kanye West, Chrisette Michele, Rick Ross, and eventually secured a place in John Legend's band. He also played saxophone on the Beyoncé single Déjà Vu, produced by Rodney "Darkchild" Jerkins

Justice, a pianist since the age of 8, attended Long Island University where he received a B.A. in music. Upon returning to Philadelphia, he worked as musical director for a number of artists, including Chrisette Michele

In 2010, Justice and Arthur were offered a publishing deal with Cherry Lane/BMG and Homeschool Entertainment; they subsequently produced a number of singles including the Soul Train Award-Winning and Grammy Nominated  "Tonight (Best You Ever Had)", performed by John Legend, ft. Ludacris.

Discography

Singles Produced

2010
Rick Ross featuring John Legend —Sweet Life - Cut from a Different Cloth...
Sweet Life

2011
Ledisi — Pieces of Me
 I Miss You Now

2012
John Legend, featuring Ludacris — Think Like a Man Soundtrack
Tonight (Best You Ever Had)

Miguel — Kaleidoscope Dream
The Thrill

Ne-Yo — R.E.D.
"Forever Now"
"Jealous"
"Unconditional"

2013
Hamilton Park Featuring Alley Boy
Derrière (single)

TLC — 20
Meant to Be

Yo-Gotti featuring Ne-Yo — I Am
Respect That You Earn

Sean Kingston — Back 2 Life
Love Ecstasy

Ro James featuring Snoop Dogg — Cadillacs
84

2014
RaVaughn featuring Fabolous
ISFU (single)

2015
SoMo — My Life II
Make Up Sex
On and On
Why Wait

Jovanie — What's the Move Pt. II
Who Knows
Whatchu Think About

Tracy T — 50 Shades of Green
Be Wit Me

2016
Eric Bellinger — Eventually
Mean What You Say

Awards and nominations

Grammy Awards

The Grammy Awards are awarded annually by the National Academy of Recording Arts and Sciences. Butta-N-BizKit have been nominated three times.

|-
|rowspan="1"|2012
|"Pieces of Me" (Ledisi)
|Best R&B Performance
|
|-
|rowspan="2"|2013
|"Tonight (Best You Ever Had)" (John Legend, featuring Ludacris)
|Best Rap/Sung Collaboration
|
|-
|"Kaleidoscope Dream" (Miguel)
|rowspan="2"|Best Urban Contemporary Album
|
|-

Soul Train Awards

References

Musical groups from Philadelphia
Musical groups from Los Angeles